Sítio d'Abadia is a municipality in eastern Goiás state, Brazil.

Location
Sítio d'Abadia is located in a corner of eastern Goiás, 14 kilometers north of the border with Minas Gerais.  It is about 30 kilometers west of the border with Bahia.  It is one of the most isolated towns in the state of Goiás, and can be accessed only by paved highway by driving north to Damianópolis.  It belongs to the Vão do Paranã statistical micro-region.

The distance to Goiânia is 561 km.  Highway connections are made by BR-153 / Anápolis / GO-060 / Alexânia / Planaltina / Formosa / GO-020 / BR-030 /  Vila Boa / GO-112 Alvorada do Norte / Vila Capão / GO-236 / Buritinópolis / Mambaí / GO-108 / Damianópolis.

Municipal boundaries are with:
north:  Alvorada do Norte and Damianópolis
west:  Flores de Goiás
south:  Minas Gerais
east:  Bahia

Demographics
Population density:  2.03 inhabitants/km2 (2007)
Urban/Rural population: 1,034/2,217 
Population growth rate 1996/2007:   1.07%

Economy
The economy is based on modest services, public administration, agriculture and cattle raising.  There were no banks and 13 commercial establishments in August 2007.  There were 52 automobiles in 2007.  In 2006 there were 29,000 head of cattle.  The main agricultural products were rice, bananas, sugarcane, manioc, beans, corn, and soybeans (2,000 hectares planted).
Motor vehicles: 80 (automobiles and pickup trucks)
Number of inhabitants per motor vehicle: 41

Agricultural data 2006
Farms:  499
Total area:  90,612 ha.
Area of permanent crops: 127 ha.
Area of perennial crops: 5,272 ha.
Area of natural pasture:  67,823 ha. 
Area of woodland and forests:  16,693 ha. 
Persons dependent on farming:  1,550
Tractors:  97
Cattle herd:  29,000 
Main crops: soybeans on 2,000 hectares

Health and education
Literacy rate:  74.4
Infant mortality rate:  36.25 for 1000 live births
Life expectancy: 
Hospitals: none
Schools: 8 with 1,020 students 
Sítio d'Abadia is a very poor town in one of the poorest areas of the state.  In 2000 it was ranked 235 out of 242 municipalities in the state of Goiás on the United Nations Human Development Index with a score of 0.643.  Nationally it was ranked 3,875 out of 5,507 municipalities.

Tourism
Sítio d'Abadia has one of the largest waterfalls in the state located on the Rio Corrente. See Cachoeiras d'Abadia

See also
List of municipalities in Goiás
Vão do Paranã Microregion
Microregions in Goiás

References

Municipalities in Goiás